Edward Acevedo may refer to:

Edward Acevedo (footballer) (born 1985), Dominican footballer
Edward Acevedo (politician) (born 1963), American politician